Yasi may refer to:

Cyclones
Cyclone Yasi (1996), a tropical storm that brought heavy rainfall to Tonga.
Cyclone Yasi, a Category 4 tropical cyclone that caused significant damage in Queensland, Australia in 2011.

Other uses
Turkestan (city), of which Yasi is the historical name
YASI, a summer program at Rhode Island's Trinity Repertory Company
S. yasi, a species of Santalum

See also 
 Iasi (disambiguation)
 Yassy (disambiguation)